Ryan Sommer (born August 27, 1993) is a Canadian bobsledder.

Career
He participated at the IBSF World Championships 2019, winning a medal in the four-man event.

In January 2022, Sommer was named to Canada's 2022 Olympic team. Sommer would go onto win the bronze medal in the Four-man event.

On August 25, 2022, Sommer announced his retirement from the sport.

References

External links

Ryan Sommer at the Canadian Olympic Committee

1993 births
Living people
Canadian male bobsledders
Bobsledders at the 2022 Winter Olympics
Olympic bobsledders of Canada
Olympic medalists in bobsleigh
Olympic bronze medalists for Canada
Medalists at the 2022 Winter Olympics